The Explosives Act 1957, is a Malaysian laws which enacted relating to the manufacture, use, sale, storage, transport, import and export of explosives.

Structure
The Explosives Act 1957, in its current form (1 January 2006), consists of 3 Parts containing 28 sections and 1 schedule (including 5 amendments).
 Section 1: Short title
 Section 2: Interpretation
 Section 3: Extension of definition of explosive to other explosive substances
 Section 4: Power to prohibit the manufacture, possession or importation of specially dangerous explosives
 Section 5: Dangerous acts
 Section 6: Penalty for causing explosion likely to endanger life or property
 Section 7: Penalty for attempt to cause explosion, or for making or keeping explosive with intent to endanger life or property
 Section 8: Penalty for making or possessing explosives under suspicious circumstances
 Section 9: Search for explosives under warrant
 Section 10: Search warrant against persons
 Section 11: Entry and search by Magistrate, etc.
 Section 12: Power to stop and search for explosive in the street
 Section 13: Entry on place where explosive is used
 Section 14: Production of licence and accounting for explosives
 Section 15: Arrest without warrant
 Section 16: Abetment and attempt
 Section 17: Forfeiture of explosives
 Section 18: Seizure and sale of vessels
 Section 19: Rewards to informers
 Section 20: Liability of principal for offences committed by agent, etc.
 Section 21: Where licensee under disability
 Section 22: Presumptions
 Section 23: Notice of accidents
 Section 24: Enquiry into accidents
 Section 25: Minister may authorize magazines or hulks
 Section 26: Regulations
 Section 27: Non-application in respect of Government, etc.
 Section 28: Repeal and saving
 Schedule

References

External links
 Explosives Act 1957 

1957 in Malayan law
Malaysian federal legislation